Han poetry as a style of poetry resulted in significant poems which are still preserved today, and whose origins are associated with the Han dynasty era of China, 206 BC – 220 AD, including the Wang Mang interregnum (9–23 AD). The final years at the end of the Han era (known by the name Jian'an, 196–220) often receive special handling for purposes of literary analysis because, among other things, the poetry and culture of this period is less than typical of the Han period, and has important characteristics of its own, or it shares literary aspects with the subsequent Three Kingdoms period. This poetry reflects one of the poetry world's more important flowerings, as well as being a special period in Classical Chinese poetry, particularly in regard to the development of the quasipoetic fu; the activities of the Music Bureau in connection with the collection of popular ballads and the resultant development of what would eventually become known as the yuefu, or as the rhapsodic formal style; and, finally, towards the end of the Han dynasty, the development of a new style of shi poetry, as the later development of the yuehfu into regular, fixed-line length forms makes it difficult to distinguish in form from the shi form of poetic verse, and at what point specific poems are classified as one or the other is somewhat arbitrary. Another important poetic contribution from the Han era is the compilation of the Chuci anthology, which contains some of the oldest and most important poetic verses to be preserved from ancient China, as well as the transmission of the Shijing anthology.

General background

The ruling dynastic family of the Han dynasty was the Liu family, founded by Liu Bang, whose career ranged from being a minor official (sort of like a local sheriff during the rapid disintegration and chaos of the final years of the Qin dynasty) to being an outlaw and a rebel hiding out in the hills, to being the King of Chu during the Division of Qin into 18 states, or kingdoms. He was posthumously honored as Han High Founder or Han Great Ancestor (Gaozu) Emperor. Despite his folksy background, general lack of literacy, and what were considered generally vulgar ways, Liu Bang had a great regard for literature and learning. His patronage of literature and the arts, as well as his connections with the unique culture of Chu would set a precedent for the rest of the dynasty which he founded, and which managed to keep much of the political power in the hands of the Liu family: often this was implemented by allowing Liu family princes a great deal of autonomy in their local areas, thus encouraging the development of subsidiary royal courts, besides the main imperial court; and, in some cases, this encouraged princely patronage of literature and the arts, with some greater diversity and cross-fertilization of artistic genres and styles. Other important features of the Han era include the location of the capital in Chang'an during Western Han, and its move to Luoyang in Eastern Han, the extension of the Han empire into new regions, and contact with new peoples and cultures, a development which was extended by the further explorations by people such as Zhang Qian of the Silk Roads fame who in the 2nd century BC got as far as Bactria and Dayuan (Ferghana, in modern eastern Uzbekistan), and among other things brought back alfalfa and grapes to China. Also important in the history of the Han dynasty is the method of recording words, such as poems. Brushing characters with ink is archeologically attested to during the Han period, including on silk, hemp paper, and bamboo slips. The bamboo (or wood) slips were tied together carefully with delicate string cords. When these rotted and broke, the individual slips would become mixed up, and the text which was written upon them thus have often become scrambled. Methods such as stamping or marking on clay or engraving on stone were also used; and, though relatively durable required fairly elaborate craftsmanship to produce. Little poetry from the Han dynasty survives as originally recorded or published, instead most of the preserved poems exist as passed on to the future by the Six Dynasties poetry era anthologies.

Poetic background

An important part of the poetic legacy received by Han dynasty poets was the Shijing verse style, typified by its "classic" four-character line verse. The influences of the Shijing verses during the Han era were directed towards important aspects of Classical Chinese poetry, such as use of the direct voice of immediate experience which was intended to provide a window into expressing a person's soul.  Another important legacy received by the Han poets was that of the Chu Ci genre of poetry with innovations in some of its verse forms, such as varied line lengths, a body of material which was expanded by further additions by Han poets, and then published in an edited anthology. Furthermore, there was a received tradition of orally transmitted folk songs and folk ballads. The imperial court of the preceding primitive Qin dynasty was not known for its poetry: the primitive Qin, instead, preferred the primitive activity known as the burning of books and burying of scholars (Chinese: 焚書坑儒; pinyin: fénshū kēngrú) and, in the end,  the "fires of Qin" extended to the destruction of its imperial library. There was little or no direct poetic influence from that source. The extension of the Han empire into new areas introduced new and exotic concepts and material objects, which sometimes became the topics of works in the fu prose-poetry literary form. Also, during the Han dynasty, state policies in regard to the philosophical dialog associated with Confucius focused a certain amount of public attention and public funding supporting the Shijing (Classic of Poetry), which from then on was regarded as one of the few members of the select list of canonical classic works.

Han dynasty poets
Some well-known poets from Han times are known; however, many of the poets are anonymous, including the poets behind the Music Bureau collections including the Nineteen Old Songs, as is typical of verses from the folk ballad tradition. Important individual Han era authors of poetry include Zhang Heng and Liu Xiang. Many of the Han poets who wrote in their own personal voice under their own name or pen-name wrote in the fu style, in the sao (Chuci) style, or both. In other cases, poems have been attributed to specific Han dynasty persons, or written in perspective of their persona, but the real author remains unknown. For example, the cases of the poems attributed to Su Wu and Consort Ban are not determined. Other Han poets include Sima Xiangru, Ban Gu, and Mi Heng.

Sima Xiangru

Sima Xiangru (179–127 BC, also known as Szu-ma Hsiang-ju) was one of the most important poets of the Han dynastic era, writing in both the Chuci and the fu styles.

Su Wu

Su Wu (140 – 60 BC) was held captive for 19 years, returning to China in 81 BC: 4 poems collected in the Wen Xuan are only questionably attributed to him. However, at the time, it was not uncustomary to confuse the persona of a poem with the person of the author. There is a story about Su Wu which became a common allusion in Chinese poetry. According to this story, during the beginning of his captivity in the Xiongnu empire Su Wu was treated harshly, to the point it is said of having to eat the lining of his coat for food and to drink snow which he melted for water. Later Su was elevated in status, even it is said given a wife who bore him children. Upon the Han emperor sending an ambassadorial mission toward the territory in which he was being held, the Xiongnu ruler (the chanyu) wished to conceal the presence of Su Wu, presumably in order avoid diplomatic complications; but, Su Wu hearing of this tricked the chanyu by claiming that he had sent a message to the emperor by tying it to the leg of a goose, and accordingly, that since his presence was already known to the Chinese delegation that any attempts at concealing his presence would be viewed as unseemly. This is at least part of the origin of the use of the image of a flying goose as a messenger, carrying tied to its foot (perhaps symbolically) a letter between two people separated so far seasonally north and south that a migrating goose could be conceived as a possible mode of communication.

Ban Jieyu (Lady Pan)
Ban Jieyu also known as Lady Pan (Pan Chieh-Yü) was a concubine to Emperor Cheng of Han (reigned 33–7 BC) and the great-aunt of the poet, historian, and author Ban Gu. A well-known poem in the Wen Xuan is attributed to her. Although most unlikely to actually be by her (especially since it is not in her grand-nephew Ban's biography of her), it is certainly written as if it could have been written by her or someone in her position. It is an important early example of the secluded palace lady genre of poetry.

Ban Gu

Ban Gu was a 1st-century Chinese historian and poet best known for his part in compiling the historical compendium the Book of Han. Ban Gu also wrote a number of fu, which are anthologized in the Wen Xuan.

Chuci

One of the most important Han era contributions to poetry is the compilation of the Chuci anthology of poetry, which preserves many poems attributed to Qu Yuan and Song Yu from the Warring States period (ended 221 BC), though about half of the poems seem to have been in fact composed during the Han Dynasty. The meaning of Chuci is something like "The Material of Chu", referring to the ancient Land of Chu. The traditional version of the Chu Ci contains 17 major sections, anthologized with its current contents by Wang Yi, a 2nd-century AD librarian who served under Emperor Shun of Han, who appended his own verses derivative of the Chuci or "sao" style at the end of the collection, under the title of Nine Longings. The poems and pieces of the Chu Ci anthology vary in their formal poetic styles, including varying line metrics, varying use of exclamatory particles, the use or not of titles for individual pieces within a section, and the varying presence of the luan (or, envoi). Other Han period poets besides Wang Yi the librarian who are known or thought to be contributors of poems collected in the Chuci include the poet Wang Bao and the scholar Liu Xiang. Liu An, the Prince of Huainan, and his literary circle were involved with the Chuci material, but the attribution of authorship of any particular poems is uncertain.

Fu

One of the major forms of literature during the Han dynasty was the fu (sometimes translated as "rhapsody"), a kind of eclectic grab bag of prose and verse, not easy to classify in English as being either poetry or prose. In Chinese, the fu is classified as wen rather than shi, however these terms do not correspond to English categories of prose and verse (one of the differences in the traditional Chinese categorization being that shi was sung or chanted, whereas the fu was not, at least according to the Hanshu), the credibility of this being enhanced by the fact that one of the compilers of the Hanshu (also known as Book of Han or History of the Former Han Dynasty) was Ban Gu, who was himself a practitioner of the fu style. The Han fu derived from the Chuci, which was traditionally considered to be the work of Qu Yuan, who was a wanderer through the countryside and villages of the Kingdom of Chu, after his exile from court. In this context the "Li Sao" is particularly relevant. The Han fu of the second and first centuries BCE were intimately associated with the courts of the emperor and his princes. In other words, they were refined literary products, ornate, polished, and with an elite vocabulary; and, often the subject matter includes topics such as life in the palaces of the Han capital cities. The development of the fu form of literature during the Han dynasty shows a movement toward later more personal poetry and the poems of reclusion, typical for example, of Tao Yuanming, the Six Dynasties poet. The famous Han dynasty astronomer, mathematician, inventor, geographer, cartographer, artist, poet, statesman, and literary scholar Zhang Heng (78–139 CE) wrote a fu about his own, personal experience (real or imagined) of getting out of the city and its politics and getting back to the country and nature. The fu form continued to be popular in the centuries following the demise of the Han imperial power.

Oral tradition folk ballads
An important aspect of Han poetry involves the influence of the folk ballad tradition, which can be seen in the poetry collections Nineteen Old Poems and the yuefu of the Music Bureau.

Nineteen Old Poems of Han

One of the stylistically most important developments of Han poetry can be found in the Nineteen Old Poems collection. Although extant versions exist only in later collections, particularly the Wen Xuan literary compendium, the 19 poems themselves appear to be from the Han period. They are influential both toward the gushi ("old style") poetic form, but also for their "tone of brooding melancholy....Anonymous voices speaking to us from a shadowy past, they sound a note of sadness that is to dominate the poetry of the centuries that follow." Many versions of these 19 poems thus continued to be reinvented in post-Han times, including a major revival in Tang poetry times. As Nineteen Old Poems literally means "19 gushi, poetry written in inspiration by this style were referred to as being in the gushi style, or simply labeled gushi (also transcribed as ku-shi, in English).

Music Bureau (Yuefu)

Another important aspect of Han poetry involved the institution known as the Music Bureau, or, in Chinese, Yuefu (or, Yüeh-fu). This is contrast with the "literary yuefu", which are written in the general style of Music Bureau's collection of yuefu, or derived from particular pieces thereof. The Music Bureau was a Chinese governmental institution existing to historical and archeological evidence at various times during the history of China, including an incarnation during the Qin dynasty. The Han dynasty largely adopted the Qin institutions for their own organizational model, and in particular Han Wudi is associated with a revival or an elevation in the status of the Music Bureau, which he relied upon for the elaborately spectacular ceremonial performances conducted under his regime. The traditional functions of the Music Bureau included collecting music and poetry lyrics from around the empire, and conducting and choreographing their performance for the emperor and his court. Poetry verses published by the Music Bureau are known as "Music Bureau" pieces, later works modeled on the style of the Music Bureau pieces are known as "Music Bureau style" pieces (yuefu); and, some of these "literary yuefu" and "new yuefu" poems were written by some of the best of the subsequent poets. The Han era Music Bureau (yuefu) pieces were collected and transmitted to future times in such (mostly Six Dynasties era) anthologies as the Wen Xuan and the New Songs from the Jade Terrace.

Jian'an poetry and the future of Yuefu

The final regnal era of Han was called Jian'an. At this period the political structure of Han was breaking down, while new developments in poetry were arising. This Jian'an yuefu poetry style continued on into the Three Kingdoms and Six Dynasties era, as did the lives of some of the authors of poetry such as Cao Cao, who was born during the Han dynasty but survived it. The Han Music Bureau style which developed out of the models of the Music Bureau poetry was a particularly important feature of Jian'an poetry and the subsequent Six Dynasties poetry: the evolutionary trajectory of this poetry was towards the regular, fixed-length line verse which reached such acclaim in its Tang realization. Poetry preserved from the Han dynastic era not only exists as a monument to the achievement and skill of the poets of that time, but also serves as a link in a poetic legacy that was explicitly valued during the Tang dynastic era (during which the poems developed in the tradition of this style were known to critics as ("new yuefu"), and continued to be valued in subsequent Classical Chinese poetry, and on to the poetry of today; which is in turn, another link in a long chain of development in the field of poetry, to which the poets known and anonymous made their unique contributions.

See also
Ban Gu
Chu Ci
Classical Chinese poetry
Classic of Poetry
Eighteen Songs of a Nomad Flute
Emperor Wu of Han
Fu (poetry)
Guo Maoqian
Gushi (poetry)
Jian'an poetry
Kanshi (poetry)
Music Bureau
Return to the Field
Sima Xiangru
Society and culture of the Han Dynasty
Tang poetry
Zhang Heng

Notes and references
 Birrell, Anne (1988). Popular Songs and Ballads of Han China. (London: Unwin Hyman). 
 Davis, A. R. (Albert Richard), Editor and Introduction,(1970), The Penguin Book of Chinese Verse. (Baltimore: Penguin Books).
 Hawkes, David, translation, introduction, and notes (2011 [1985]). Qu Yuan et al., The Songs of the South: An Ancient Chinese Anthology of Poems by Qu Yuan and Other Poets. London: Penguin Books. 
 Hinton, David (2008). Classical Chinese Poetry: An Anthology. New York: Farrar, Straus, and Giroux.  / .
 Watson, Burton (1971). CHINESE LYRICISM: Shih Poetry from the Second to the Twelfth Century. (New York: Columbia University Press). 

Han dynasty poetry